Qila Didar Singh , is a town of Gujranwala District, Punjab, Pakistan. It is located at 32°8' N 74°1' E, west of Gujranwala city - the district capital. Its population was estimated to be 142,364 in 2017. in which 71,405 are males and 70,941 are females.The literacy rate is 69.99%.

Qila Didar Singh lies on the Gujranwala-Hafizabad Road, 17 km west of Gujranwala. The town's rice market is one of the largest in the Punjab.
In 2007, Qila Didar Singh was administratively upgraded to City Town, one of four in the Gujranwala District.

Affiliated with the University of the Punjab, there are two Govt colleges in town, one each for boys and girls, which offer BA and BSc degrees,  Govt High School No.1 & 2 among others.There were a well known personality who worked great for development of literacy rate in the area. He was also selected as the Head of main education institute, Govt. High School no.1 Qila. He was a poet of Panjabi literature also .He was Mr. Anayatullah Saif Hanjra. Qila Didar Singh is center of education and shopping for nearby villages. There are also many other educational institutions in the town.
Most notably RILLS School which is offering O level education. It is the only one of its kind in the area.

History

The origin of the town is related to a Sikh land owner called Didar Singh. When Didar Singh was married, his father gave him the lands surrounding the part of Qila Didar Singh that is currently known as "Old/Inside part of Qila". The name Qila implies a fort; this name originates in the fact that Didar Singh's family had a very large and tall mansion, which was surrounded by smaller houses. Because there was a wall surrounding the whole town with several gates, the town had the appearance of a fort.

During the Indian rebellion of 1857, British troops during chase of the rebels, arrived at the Qila and surrounded it, believing it to be a fort. Representatives of the townspeople however managed to convince the troops that the town was not in fact a fortification.

In 1947, the year of Pakistan's independence from the British Indian Empire, Qila Didar Singh was a very small town with mainly Sikh and Hindu population. Most of the Sikhs and Hindus living in the town moved to the Indian part of the Punjab and many Muslim immigrants moved to the area from the East Punjab, Haryana.

Source of income
Due to fertile soil of the surrounding area, the economic backbone of Qila Didar Singh is agriculture; the main cash crops being rice in the summer and wheat in winter.

Most people from Qila Didar Singh are self employed, have their own business because of very big rice market and lot of customer for other commodities also come from the surrounding villages. There are government employees, private employees and factory workers. There has been considerable migration from the area to other countries. Even in the British Colonial days, many local tailors became contractors of the army to supply uniforms and shoes. Many of them settled in Cyprus and Singapore. They brought prosperity to the town. Residents of Qila Didar Singh are not farmers but people living in villages around Qila Didar Singh earn their living from rice and wheat fields. A couple of hundred people from Qila Didar Singh commute to Gujranwala daily for labour or to do technical jobs in various small industries in the city. Leaving their families at home, many others work in different parts of Pakistan for their living.

See also

 Badoki Saikhwan
 Udhowali
 Hamboki
 Nokhar
 Hardoduri
Botala Janda Singh

References

Cities and towns in Gujranwala District
Populated places in Wazirabad Tehsil
Union councils of Wazirabad Tehsil